is a National Park in the Tottori, Hyōgo, and Kyōto Prefectures, Japan. Established in 1963, the park runs continuously along the Sea of Japan coast from Tottori to Kyōtango. The park covers 87.83 km². Sanin Kaigan National Park is known for its numerous inlets, rock formations, islands, and caves.

The entire area of this national park is a part of San'in Kaigan Global Geopark.

Sites of interest
 

Tottori Sand Dunes

Noted fauna and flora
Pinus thunbergii, the Japanese black pine
Japanese martin
Black-tailed gull

Related municipalities
 Kyōto: Kyōtango
 Hyōgo: Kami, Shin'onsen, Toyooka
 Tottori: Iwami, Tottori

See also

 List of national parks of Japan
 Wakasa Wan Quasi-National Park
 Tourism in Japan

References

External links
  Sanin Kaigan National Park
  Sanin Kaigan National Park
 Map of Sanin Kaigan National Park

National parks of Japan
Parks and gardens in Hyōgo Prefecture
Parks and gardens in Kyoto Prefecture
Parks and gardens in Tottori Prefecture
Protected areas established in 1963
1963 establishments in Japan